Patrick Bahanack (born 3 August 1997) is a Cameroonian professional footballer who plays as a centre-back for Greek Super League club Levadiakos.

Career

Early career
Bahanack began his career at the N.K.U.F.O. Academy Sports, Yaoundé, Cameroon in 2017 before joining Stade Reims B Team, Reims, France in 2018. He was transferred to the main Reims squad in July 2018.

Lamia
Bahanack joined Lamia from Reims on a two-year deal in August 2019.

Career statistics

Honours
Levadiakos
Super League 2: 2021–22

References

External links
Lamia Official website
Super League Greece Player Profile - Patrick Bahanack

1997 births
Living people
Association football defenders
Association football midfielders
Cameroonian footballers
Cameroonian expatriate footballers
Championnat National 2 players
Ligue 1 players
Football League (Greece) players
Super League Greece players
Super League Greece 2 players
Stade de Reims players
Ergotelis F.C. players
PAS Lamia 1964 players
Levadiakos F.C. players
Expatriate footballers in France
Cameroonian expatriate sportspeople in France
Expatriate footballers in Greece
Cameroonian expatriate sportspeople in Greece
People from  Yaoundé
Footballers from Yaoundé